Chevilly is a commune in the Loiret department in north-central France. Chevilly station has rail connections to Orléans, Étampes and Paris.

See also
 Battle of Chevilly
 Communes of the Loiret department

References

Communes of Loiret